The 1932 United States House of Representatives elections were elections for the United States House of Representatives to elect members to serve in the 73rd United States Congress. They were held for the most part on November 8, 1932, while Maine held theirs on September 12. They coincided with the landslide election of President Franklin D. Roosevelt.

The inability of Herbert Hoover to deal with the Great Depression was the main issue surrounding this election, with his overwhelming unpopularity causing his Republican Party to lose 101 seats to Roosevelt's Democratic Party and the small Farmer–Labor Party, as the Democrats expanded the majority they had gained through special elections to a commanding level.

This round of elections was seen as a referendum on the once popular Republican business practices, which were eschewed for new, more liberal Democratic ideas. This was the first time since 1894 (and the last time as of ) that any party suffered triple-digit losses, and the Democrats posted their largest net seat pick-up in their history. These elections marked the beginning of a period of dominance in the House for the Democrats: with the exception of 1946 and 1952, the party would win every House election until 1994.

This was the first election after the congressional reapportionment based on the 1930 Census, which was the first reapportionment since the passage of the Reapportionment Act of 1929 that permanently capped the House membership at 435 seats. Since no reapportionment (and in nearly all states no redistricting) had occurred after the 1920 Census, the district boundary changes from the previous election were quite substantial, representing twenty years of population movement from small towns to the more Democratic cities.

Overall results

Source:

Special elections 

There were special elections in 1932 to serve the remainder of the current 72nd United States Congress.

Special elections are sorted by date then district.

|-
! 
| Fletcher Hale
|  | Republican
| 1924
|  | Incumbent died October 22, 1931.New member elected  January 5, 1932.Democratic gain.Successor was subsequently re-elected in November, see below.
| nowrap | 

|-
! 
| Samuel Rutherford
|  | Democratic
| 1924
|  | Incumbent died February 4, 1932New member elected March 2, 1932.Democratic hold.Successor subsequently retired in November, see below.
| nowrap | 

|-
! 
| Percy Quin
|  | Democratic
| 
|  | Incumbent died February 4, 1932.New member elected March 15, 1932.Democratic hold.
| nowrap | 

|-
! 
| Félix Córdova Dávila
|  | Union Party
| 1917 
| | Incumbent resigned April 11, 1932, to become Associate Justice of the Supreme Court of Puerto Rico.New Delegate elected April 15, 1932.Independent gain.Winner was not elected to finish the term, see below.
| 

|-
! 
| James R. Leech
|  | Republican
| 
|  | Incumbent resigned January 29, 1932, to become a member of the United States Board of Tax Appeals.New member elected April 26, 1932.Republican hold.
| nowrap | 

|-
! 
| Edward E. Eslick
|  | Democratic
| 
|  | Incumbent died June 14, 1932.New member elected August 14, 1932.Democratic hold.
| nowrap | 

|-
! 
| Charles R. Crisp
|  | Democratic
| 
|  | Incumbent resigned October 7, 1932, to become a member of the US Tariff Commission.New member elected November 8, 1932.Democratic hold.
| nowrap | 

|-
! 
| J. Charles Linthicum
|  | Democratic
| 
|  | Incumbent died October 5, 1932.New member elected November 8, 1932.Democratic hold.
| nowrap | 

|-
! 
| George A. Welsh
|  | Republican
| 
|  | Incumbent resigned May 31, 1932, to become judge for the United States District Court for the Eastern District of Pennsylvania.New member elected November 8, 1932.Republican hold.
| nowrap | 

|-
! 
| Edward M. Beers
|  | Republican
| 
|  | Incumbent died April 21, 1932.New member elected November 8, 1932.Republican hold.Winner was not elected to the next term, see below.
| nowrap | 

|-
! 
| Henry St. George Tucker III
|  | Democratic
| 
|  | Incumbent died July 23, 1932.New member elected November 8, 1932.Democratic hold.
| nowrap | 

|}

Alabama 

|-
! 
| John McDuffie
|  | Democratic
| 1918
| Incumbent re-elected.
| nowrap | 

|-
! 
| J. Lister Hill
|  | Democratic
| 1923 
| Incumbent re-elected.
| nowrap | 

|-
! 
| Henry B. Steagall
|  | Democratic
| 1914
| Incumbent re-elected.
| nowrap | 

|-
! 
| Lamar Jeffers
|  | Democratic
| 1921 
| Incumbent re-elected.
| nowrap | 

|-
! rowspan=2 | 
| LaFayette L. Patterson
|  | Democratic
| 1928
|  | Incumbent lost renomination.Democratic loss.
| rowspan=2 nowrap | 

|-
| Miles C. Allgood
|  | Democratic
| 1922
| Incumbent re-elected.

|-
! 
| William B. Oliver
|  | Democratic
| 1914
| Incumbent re-elected.
| nowrap | 

|-
! 
| William B. Bankhead
|  | Democratic
| 1916
| Incumbent re-elected.
| nowrap | 

|-
! 
| Edward B. Almon
|  | Democratic
| 1914
| Incumbent re-elected.
| nowrap | 

|-
! 
| George Huddleston
|  | Democratic
| 1914
| Incumbent re-elected.
| nowrap | 

|}

Alaska Territory 
See Non-voting delegates, below.

Arizona 

|-
! 
| Lewis W. Douglas
|  | Democratic
| 1926
| Incumbent re-elected.
| nowrap | 

|}

Arkansas 

|-
! 
| William J. Driver
|  | Democratic
| 1920
| Incumbent re-elected.
| nowrap | 

|-
! 
| John E. Miller
|  | Democratic
| 1930
| Incumbent re-elected.
| nowrap | 

|-
! 
| Claude Fuller
|  | Democratic
| 1928
| Incumbent re-elected.
| nowrap | 

|-
! 
| Effiegene Locke Wingo
|  | Democratic
| 1930
|  | Incumbent retired.New member elected.Democratic hold.
| nowrap | 

|-
! 
| Heartsill Ragon
|  | Democratic
| 1922
| Incumbent re-elected.
| nowrap | 

|-
! 
| David Delano Glover
|  | Democratic
| 1928
| Incumbent re-elected.
| nowrap | 

|-
! 
| Tilman B. Parks
|  | Democratic
| 1920
| Incumbent re-elected.
| nowrap | 

|}

California 

Nine new seats were added in reapportionment, increasing the delegation from 11 to 20 seats. Six of the new seats were won by Democrats, three by Republicans. Three Republican incumbents lost re-election to Democrats. Therefore, Democrats increased by 10 seats and Republicans decreased by 1.

Colorado 

|-
! 
| William R. Eaton
|  | Republican
| 1928
|  | Incumbent lost re-election.New member elected.Democratic gain.
| nowrap | 

|-
! 
| Charles Bateman Timberlake
|  | Republican
| 1914
|  | Incumbent lost renomination.New member elected.Democratic gain.
| nowrap | 

|-
! 
| Guy Urban Hardy
|  | Republican
| 1918
|  | Incumbent lost re-election.New member elected.Democratic gain.
| nowrap | 

|-
! 
| Edward Thomas Taylor
|  | Democratic
| 1908
| Incumbent re-elected.
| nowrap | 

|}

Connecticut 

|-
! 
| Augustine Lonergan
|  | Democratic
| 1930
|  | Retired to run for U.S. senator.New member elected.Democratic hold.
| nowrap | 

|-
! 
| Richard P. Freeman
|  | Republican
| 1914
|  | Incumbent lost renomination.New member elected.Republican hold.
| nowrap | 

|-
! 
| John Q. Tilson
|  | Republican
| 1914
|  | Incumbent retired.New member elected.Democratic gain.
| nowrap | 

|-
! 
| William L. Tierney
|  | Democratic
| 1930
|  | Incumbent lost re-election.New member elected.Republican gain.
| nowrap | 

|-
! 
| Edward W. Goss
|  | Republican
| 1930
| Incumbent re-elected.
| nowrap | 

|-
! 
| colspan=3 | None (district created)
|  | New seat.New member elected.Republican gain.
| nowrap | 

|}

Delaware 

|-
! 
| Robert G. Houston
|  | Republican
| 1924
|  | Incumbent retired.New member elected.Democratic gain.
| nowrap | 

|}

Florida 

|-
! 
| Herbert J. Drane
|  | Democratic
| 1916
|  | Incumbent lost renomination.New member elected.Democratic hold.
| nowrap | 

|-
! 
| Robert A. Green
|  | Democratic
| 1924
| Incumbent re-elected.
| nowrap | 

|-
! 
| Tom A. Yon
|  | Democratic
| 1926
|  | Incumbent lost renomination.New member elected.Democratic hold.
| nowrap | 

|-
! 
| Ruth Bryan Owen
|  | Democratic
| 1928
|  | Incumbent lost renomination.New member elected.Democratic hold.
| nowrap | 

|-
! 
| colspan=3 | None (district created)
|  | New seat.New member elected.Democratic gain.
| nowrap | 

|}

Georgia 

|-
! 
| Homer C. Parker
|  | Democratic
| 1931
| Incumbent re-elected.
| nowrap | 

|-
! 
| Edward E. Cox
|  | Democratic
| 1924
| Incumbent re-elected.
| nowrap | 

|-
! 
| Charles R. Crisp
|  | Democratic
| 1896 1896 1912
|  | Incumbent resigned October 7, 1932.New member elected.Democratic hold.
| nowrap | 

|-
! 
| William C. Wright
|  | Democratic
| 1918
|  | Incumbent retired.New member elected.Democratic hold.
| nowrap | 

|-
! 
| Robert Ramspeck
|  | Democratic
| 1929
| Incumbent re-elected.
| nowrap | 

|-
! rowspan=2 | 
| W. Carlton Mobley
|  | Democratic
| 1932 
|  | Incumbent retired.Democratic loss.
| rowspan=2 nowrap | 

|-
| Carl Vinson
|  | Democratic
| 1914
| Incumbent re-elected.

|-
! 
| Malcolm C. Tarver
|  | Democratic
| 1926
| Incumbent re-elected.
| nowrap | 

|-
! 
| William C. Lankford
|  | Democratic
| 1918
|  | Incumbent lost renomination.New member elected.Democratic hold.
| nowrap | 

|-
! 
| John S. Wood
|  | Democratic
| 1930
| Incumbent re-elected.
| nowrap | 

|-
! 
| Charles H. Brand
|  | Democratic
| 1916
| Incumbent re-elected.
| nowrap | 

|}

Hawaii Territory 
See Non-voting delegates, below.

Idaho 

|-
! 
| Burton L. French
|  | Republican
| 1916
|  | Incumbent lost re-election.New member elected.Democratic gain.
| nowrap | 

|-
! 
| Addison T. Smith
|  | Republican
| 1912
|  | Incumbent lost re-election.New member elected.Democratic gain.
| nowrap | 

|}

Illinois 

|-
! 
| Oscar Stanton De Priest
|  | Republican
| 1928
| Incumbent re-elected.
| nowrap | 

|-
! 
| Morton D. Hull
|  | Republican
| 1923
|  | Incumbent retired.New member elected.Republican hold.
| nowrap | 

|-
! 
| Edward A. Kelly
|  | Democratic
| 1930
| Incumbent re-elected.
| nowrap | 

|-
! 
| Harry P. Beam
|  | Democratic
| 1930
| Incumbent re-elected.
| nowrap | 

|-
! 
| Adolph J. Sabath
|  | Democratic
| 1906
| Incumbent re-elected.
| nowrap | 

|-
! 
| James T. Igoe
|  | Democratic
| 1926
|  | Incumbent lost renomination.New member elected.Democratic hold.
| nowrap | 

|-
! 
| Leonard W. Schuetz
|  | Democratic
| 1930
| Incumbent re-elected.
| nowrap | 

|-
! 
| Peter C. Granata
|  | Republican
| 1930
|  | Incumbent lost re-election.New member elected.Democratic gain.
| nowrap | 

|-
! 
| Frederick A. Britten
|  | Republican
| 1912
| Incumbent re-elected.
| nowrap | 

|-
! 
| Carl R. Chindblom
|  | Republican
| 1918
|  | Incumbent lost renomination.New member elected.Republican hold.
| nowrap | 

|-
! 
| Frank R. Reid
|  | Republican
| 1922
| Incumbent re-elected.
| nowrap | 

|-
! 
| John T. Buckbee
|  | Republican
| 1926
| Incumbent re-elected.
| nowrap | 

|-
! 
| William Richard Johnson
|  | Republican
| 1924
|  | Incumbent lost renomination.New member elected.Republican hold.
| nowrap | 

|-
! 
| John Clayton Allen
|  | Republican
| 1924
|  | Incumbent lost re-election.New member elected.Democratic gain.
| nowrap | 

|-
! 
| Burnett M. Chiperfield
|  | Republican
| 1930
|  | Incumbent lost re-election.New member elected.Democratic gain.
| nowrap | 

|-
! 
| William E. Hull
|  | Republican
| 1922
|  | Incumbent lost renomination.New member elected.Republican hold.
| nowrap | 

|-
! 
| Homer W. Hall
|  | Republican
| 1926
|  | Incumbent lost re-election.New member elected.Democratic gain.
| nowrap | 

|-
! 
| William P. Holaday
|  | Republican
| 1922
|  | Incumbent lost re-election.New member elected.Democratic gain.
| nowrap | 

|-
! 
| Charles Adkins
|  | Republican
| 1924
|  | Incumbent lost re-election.New member elected.Democratic gain.
| nowrap | 

|-
! 
| Henry T. Rainey
|  | Democratic
| 1922
| Incumbent re-elected.
| nowrap | 

|-
! 
| J. Earl Major
|  | Democratic
| 1930
| Incumbent re-elected.
| nowrap | 

|-
! 
| Charles A. Karch
|  | Democratic
| 1930
|  | Incumbent died in office.New member elected.Democratic hold.
| 

|-
! 
| William W. Arnold
|  | Democratic
| 1922
| Incumbent re-elected.
| nowrap | 

|-
! 
| Claude V. Parsons
|  | Democratic
| 1930
| Incumbent re-elected.
| nowrap | 

|-
! 
| Kent E. Keller
|  | Democratic
| 1930
| Incumbent re-elected.
| nowrap | 

|-
! rowspan=2 | 
| William H. Dieterich
|  | Democratic
| 1930
|  | Incumbent retired to run for U.S. senator.New member elected.Democratic hold.
| rowspan=2 nowrap | 

|-
| Richard Yates Jr.
|  | Republican
| 1918
|  | Incumbent lost re-election.New member elected.Democratic gain.

|}

Indiana 

Indiana gained one seat in reapportionment.  All of the incumbents were redistricted.  The new seat was won by a Democrat and all the other incumbent Democrats won re-election.  All three incumbent Republicans lost re-election, bringing the state from 8-3 Democratic to 12-0 Democratic.

|-
! 
| colspan=3 | None (district created)
|  | New seat.New member elected.Democratic gain.
| nowrap | 

|-
! 
| William R. Wood
|  | Republican
| 1914
|  | Incumbent lost re-election.New member elected.Democratic gain.
| nowrap | 

|-
! 
| Samuel B. Pettengill
|  | Democratic
| 1930
| Incumbent re-elected.
| nowrap | 

|-
! 
| David Hogg
|  | Republican
| 1924
|  | Incumbent lost re-election.New member elected.Democratic gain.
| nowrap | 

|-
! 
| Glenn Griswold
|  | Democratic
| 1930
| Incumbent re-elected.
| nowrap | 

|-
! 
| Fred S. Purnell
|  | Republican
| 1916
|  | Incumbent lost re-election.New member elected.Democratic gain.
| nowrap | 

|-
! 
| Arthur H. Greenwood
|  | Democratic
| 1922
| Incumbent re-elected.
| nowrap | 

|-
! 
| John W. Boehne Jr.
|  | Democratic
| 1930
| Incumbent re-elected.
| nowrap | 

|-
! 
| Eugene B. Crowe
|  | Democratic
| 1930
| Incumbent re-elected.
| nowrap | 

|-
! 
| Harry C. Canfield
|  | Democratic
| 1922
|  | Incumbent lost renomination.New member elected.Democratic hold.
| nowrap | 

|-
! 
| William H. Larrabee
|  | Democratic
| 1930
| Incumbent re-elected.
| nowrap | 

|-
! 
| Louis Ludlow
|  | Democratic
| 1928
| Incumbent re-elected.
| nowrap | 

|}

Iowa 

|-
! 
| William F. Kopp
|  | Republican
| 1920
|  | Incumbent lost re-election.New member elected.Democratic gain.
| nowrap | 

|-
! 
| Bernhard M. Jacobsen
|  | Democratic
| 1930
| Incumbent re-elected.
| nowrap | 

|-
! 
| Thomas J. B. Robinson
|  | Republican
| 1922
|  | Incumbent lost re-election.New member elected.Democratic gain.
| nowrap | 

|-
! 
| Gilbert N. Haugen
|  | Republican
| 1898
|  | Incumbent lost re-election.New member elected.Democratic gain.
| nowrap | 

|-
! rowspan=3 | 
| Cyrenus Cole
|  | Republican
| 1920
|  | Incumbent retired.Republican loss.
| rowspan=3 nowrap | 

|-
| Lloyd Thurston
|  | Republican
| 1924
| Incumbent re-elected.

|-
| C. William Ramseyer
|  | Republican
| 1914
|  | Incumbent lost renomination.Republican loss.

|-
! 
| Cassius C. Dowell
|  | Republican
| 1914
| Incumbent re-elected.
| nowrap | 

|-
! 
| Charles Edward Swanson
|  | Republican
| 1928
|  | Incumbent lost re-election.New member elected.Democratic gain.
| nowrap | 

|-
! 
| Fred C. Gilchrist
|  | Republican
| 1930
| Incumbent re-elected.
| nowrap | 

|-
! 
| Ed H. Campbell
|  | Republican
| 1928
|  | Incumbent lost re-election.New member elected.Democratic gain.
| nowrap | 

|}

Kansas 

The eighth district was eliminated when the state was reapportioned from eight to seven districts.  Two incumbent Republicans lost re-election.  One incumbent Republican lost renomination and his seat was won by the incumbent Democrat from the district that was merged into his.

|-
! rowspan=2 | 
| William P. Lambertson
|  | Republican
| 1928
| Incumbent re-elected.
| rowspan=2 nowrap | 

|-
| James G. Strong
|  | Republican
| 1918
|  | Incumbent lost renomination.Republican loss.

|-
! 
| Ulysses Samuel Guyer
|  | Republican
| 1926
| Incumbent re-elected.
| nowrap | 

|-
! 
| Harold C. McGugin
|  | Republican
| 1930
| Incumbent re-elected.
| nowrap | 

|-
! 
| Homer Hoch
|  | Republican
| 1918
|  | Incumbent lost re-election.New member elected.Democratic gain.
| nowrap | 

|-
! 
| William Augustus Ayres
|  | Democratic
| 1922
| Incumbent re-elected.
| nowrap | 

|-
! 
| Charles I. Sparks
|  | Republican
| 1928
|  | Incumbent lost re-election.New member elected.Democratic gain.
| nowrap | 

|-
! 
| Clifford R. Hope
|  | Republican
| 1926
| Incumbent re-elected.
| nowrap | 

|}

Kentucky 

Kentucky, reapportioned from 11 districts down to 9, elected all of its representatives on a statewide at-large ticket. Of the nine incumbent Democratic representatives, seven were re-elected on the general ticket and two retired, while both incumbent Republicans retired.

|-
! rowspan=11 | 
| William Voris Gregory
|  | Democratic
| 1926
| Incumbent re-elected.
| rowspan=11 nowrap | 

|-
| Glover H. Cary
|  | Democratic
| 1930
| Incumbent re-elected.

|-
| John Moore
|  | Democratic
| 1929
|  | Incumbent retired.New member elected.Democratic hold.

|-
| Cap R. Carden
|  | Democratic
| 1930
| Incumbent re-elected.

|-
| Brent Spence
|  | Democratic
| 1930
| Incumbent re-elected.

|-
| Virgil Chapman
|  | Democratic
| 1930
| Incumbent re-elected.

|-
| Ralph Gilbert
|  | Democratic
| 1930
|  | Incumbent retired.New member elected.Democratic hold.

|-
| Fred M. Vinson
|  | Democratic
| 1930
| Incumbent re-elected.

|-
| Andrew J. May
|  | Democratic
| 1930
| Incumbent re-elected.

|-
| Maurice H. Thatcher
|  | Republican
| 1922
|  | Incumbent retired.Republican loss.

|-
| Charles Finley
|  | Republican
| 1930
|  | Incumbent retired.Republican loss.

|}

Louisiana 

Louisiana continued to elect its representatives based upon districts adopted in 1912. Those districts did not change until the 1968 elections.

|-
! 
| Joachim O. Fernandez
|  | Democratic
| 1930
| Incumbent re-elected.
| nowrap | 

|-
! 
| Paul H. Maloney
|  | Democratic
| 1930
| Incumbent re-elected.
| nowrap | 

|-
! 
| Numa F. Montet
|  | Democratic
| 1929
| Incumbent re-elected.
| nowrap | 

|-
! 
| John N. Sandlin
|  | Democratic
| 1920
| Incumbent re-elected.
| nowrap | 

|-
! 
| Riley Joseph Wilson
|  | Democratic
| 1914
| Incumbent re-elected.
| nowrap | 

|-
! 
| Bolivar E. Kemp
|  | Democratic
| 1924
| Incumbent re-elected.
| nowrap | 

|-
! 
| René Louis DeRouen
|  | Democratic
| 1927
| Incumbent re-elected.
| nowrap | 

|-
! 
| John H. Overton
|  | Democratic
| 1931
|  | Retired to run for U.S. senator.New member elected.Democratic hold.
| nowrap | 

|}

Maine 

Maine was redistricted from four seats down to three; of four Republican incumbents, only one was re-elected; one retired and two were defeated by Democratic challengers.

|-
! 
| Carroll L. Beedy
|  | Republican
| 1920
| Incumbent re-elected.
| nowrap | 

|-
! rowspan=2 | 
| Donald B. Partridge
|  | Republican
| 1930
|  | Incumbent retired.Republican loss.
| rowspan=2 nowrap | 

|-
| John E. Nelson
|  | Republican
| 1922
|  | Incumbent lost re-election.New member elected.Democratic gain.

|-
! 
| Donald F. Snow
|  | Republican
| 1928
|  | Incumbent lost renomination.New member elected.Democratic gain.
| nowrap | 

|}

Maryland 

|-
! 
| T. Alan Goldsborough
|  | Democratic
| 1920
| Incumbent re-elected.
| nowrap | 

|-
! 
| William P. Cole Jr.
|  | Democratic
| 1930
| Incumbent re-elected.
| nowrap | 

|-
! 
| Vincent Luke Palmisano
|  | Democratic
| 1926
| Incumbent re-elected.
| nowrap | 

|-
! 
| J. Charles Linthicum
|  | Democratic
| 1910
|  | Incumbent died October 5, 1932.New member elected.Democratic hold.Winner also elected the same day to finish the current term.
| nowrap | 

|-
! 
| Stephen W. Gambrill
|  | Democratic
| 1924
| Incumbent re-elected.
| nowrap | 

|-
! 
| David J. Lewis
|  | Democratic
| 1930
| Incumbent re-elected.
| nowrap | 

|}

Massachusetts 

Massachusetts was redistricted from 16 districts to 15; 10 Republican and 4 Democratic incumbents were re-elected, while 2 Republican incumbents retired in the old 8th and 9th districts; the new 8th containing parts of both elected a Democrat.

|-
! 
| Allen T. Treadway
|  | Republican
| 1912
| Incumbent re-elected.
| nowrap | 

|-
! 
| William J. Granfield
|  | Democratic
| 1930
| Incumbent re-elected.
| nowrap | 

|-
! 
| Frank H. Foss
|  | Republican
| 1924
| Incumbent re-elected.
| nowrap | 

|-
! 
| Pehr G. Holmes
|  | Republican
| 1930
| Incumbent re-elected.
| nowrap | 

|-
! 
| Edith Nourse Rogers
|  | Republican
| 1925
| Incumbent re-elected.
| nowrap | 

|-
! 
| Abram Andrew
|  | Republican
| 1921
| Incumbent re-elected.
| nowrap | 

|-
! 
| William P. Connery Jr.
|  | Democratic
| 1922
| Incumbent re-elected.
| nowrap | 

|-
! 
| Frederick W. Dallinger
|  | Republican
| 1926
|  | Incumbent resigned October 1, 1932.New member elected.Democratic gain.
| nowrap | 

|-
! 
| Robert Luce
|  | Republican
| 1918
| Incumbent re-elected.
| nowrap | 

|-
! 
| George H. Tinkham
|  | Republican
| 1914
| Incumbent re-elected.
| nowrap | 

|-
! 
| John J. Douglass
|  | Democratic
| 1924
| Incumbent re-elected.
| nowrap | 

|-
! 
| John William McCormack
|  | Democratic
| 1928
| Incumbent re-elected.
| nowrap | 

|-
! 
| Richard B. Wigglesworth
|  | Republican
| 1928
| Incumbent re-elected.
| nowrap | 

|-
! 
| Joseph William Martin Jr.
|  | Republican
| 1924
| Incumbent re-elected.
| nowrap | 

|-
! 
| Charles L. Gifford
|  | Republican
| 1922
| Incumbent re-elected.
| nowrap | 

|}

Michigan 

Michigan was redistricted from 13 to 17 districts, adding four new districts in and around Detroit.

|-
! 
| colspan=3 | None (district created)
|  | New seat.New member elected.Democratic gain.
| nowrap | 

|-
! 
| Earl C. Michener
|  | Republican
| 1918
|  | Incumbent lost re-election.New member elected.Democratic gain.
| nowrap | 

|-
! 
| Joseph L. Hooper
|  | Republican
| 1925
| Incumbent re-elected.
| nowrap | 

|-
! 
| John C. Ketcham
|  | Republican
| 1920
|  | Incumbent lost re-election.New member elected.Democratic gain.
| nowrap | 

|-
! 
| Carl E. Mapes
|  | Republican
| 1912
| Incumbent re-elected.
| nowrap | 

|-
! 
| Seymour H. Person
|  | Republican
| 1930
|  | Incumbent lost re-election.New member elected.Democratic gain.
| nowrap | 

|-
! 
| Jesse P. Wolcott
|  | Republican
| 1930
| Incumbent re-elected.
| nowrap | 

|-
! 
| Michael J. Hart
|  | Democratic
| 1931
| Incumbent re-elected.
| nowrap | 

|-
! 
| James C. McLaughlin
|  | Republican
| 1906
|  | Incumbent lost re-election.New member elected.Democratic gain.
| nowrap | 

|-
! 
| Roy O. Woodruff
|  | Republican
| 1920
| Incumbent re-elected.
| nowrap | 

|-
! 
| Frank P. Bohn
|  | Republican
| 1926
|  | Incumbent lost re-election.New member elected.Democratic gain.
| nowrap | 

|-
! 
| W. Frank James
|  | Republican
| 1914
| Incumbent re-elected.
| nowrap | 

|-
! 
| Clarence J. McLeod
|  | Republican
| 1922
| Incumbent re-elected.
| nowrap | 

|-
! 
| Robert H. Clancy
|  | Republican
| 1926
|  | Incumbent lost re-election.New member elected.Democratic gain.
| nowrap | 

|-
! 
| colspan=3 | None (district created)
|  | New seat.New member elected.Democratic gain.
| nowrap | 

|-
! 
| colspan=3 | None (district created)
|  | New seat.New member elected.Democratic gain.
| nowrap | 

|-
! 
| colspan=3 | None (district created)
|  | New seat.New member elected.Republican gain.
| nowrap | 

|}

Minnesota 

Minnesota, reapportioned from 10 seats down to 9, elected all representatives on a statewide general ticket. Of the 10 incumbents, only 1 Farmer–Labor and 1 Republican were re-elected. The other Republicans either lost re-election (4), lost renomination (3), or retired (1). The delegation changed therefore from overwhelmingly Republican (9-1) to a majority Farmer-Labor (5–4).

|-
! rowspan=10 | 
| Victor Christgau
|  | Republican
| 1928
|  | Incumbent lost renomination.New member elected.Republican hold.
| rowspan=10 nowrap | 

|-
| August H. Andresen
|  | Republican
| 1924
|  | Incumbent lost re-election.New member elected.Farmer–Labor gain.

|-
| Melvin J. Maas
|  | Republican
| 1926
|  | Incumbent lost renomination.New member elected.Democratic gain.

|-
| William I. Nolan
|  | Republican
| 1929 
|  | Incumbent lost re-election.New member elected.Farmer–Labor gain.

|-
| Harold Knutson
|  | Republican
| 1916
| Incumbent re-elected.

|-
| Paul John Kvale
|  | Farmer–Labor
| 1929 
| Incumbent re-elected.

|-
| William A. Pittenger
|  | Republican
| 1928
|  | Incumbent lost re-election.New member elected.Farmer–Labor gain.

|-
| Conrad Selvig
|  | Republican
| 1926
|  | Incumbent lost re-election.New member elected.Farmer–Labor gain.

|-
| Godfrey G. Goodwin
|  | Republican
| 1924
|  | Incumbent lost renomination.New member elected.Republican hold.

|-
| Frank Clague
|  | Republican
| 1920
|  | Incumbent retired.Republican loss.

|}

Mississippi 

Redistricted from 8 districts to 7, with most of the 8th district being added to the 7th.

|-
! 
| John E. Rankin
|  | Democratic
| 1920
| Incumbent re-elected.
| nowrap | 

|-
! 
| Wall Doxey
|  | Democratic
| 1928
| Incumbent re-elected.
| nowrap | 

|-
! 
| William Madison Whittington
|  | Democratic
| 1924
| Incumbent re-elected.
| nowrap | 

|-
! 
| Jeff Busby
|  | Democratic
| 1922
| Incumbent re-elected.
| nowrap | 

|-
! 
| Ross A. Collins
|  | Democratic
| 1920
| Incumbent re-elected.
| nowrap | 

|-
! 
| Robert S. Hall
|  | Democratic
| 1928
|  | Lost renomination.New member elected.Democratic hold.
| nowrap | 

|-
! 
| Lawrence Russell Ellzey
|  | Democratic
| 1932
| Incumbent re-elected.
| nowrap | 

|}

Missouri 

Missouri was reapportioned from 16 seats to 13, which were elected on a general ticket. The delegation went from 12 Democrats and 4 Republicans to 13 Democrats, 8 of them previous incumbents.

|-
! rowspan=16 | 
| Milton A. Romjue
|  | Democratic
| 1922
| Incumbent re-elected.
| rowspan=16 nowrap | 

|-
| Ralph F. Lozier
|  | Democratic
| 1922
| Incumbent re-elected.

|-
| Jacob L. Milligan
|  | Democratic
| 1922
| Incumbent re-elected.

|-
| David W. Hopkins
|  | Republican
| 1929
|  | Incumbent lost re-election.New member elected.Democratic gain.

|-
| Joseph B. Shannon
|  | Democratic
| 1930
| Incumbent re-elected.

|-
| Clement C. Dickinson
|  | Democratic
| 1930
| Incumbent re-elected.

|-
| Robert Davis Johnson
|  | Democratic
| 1931
|  | Incumbent lost renomination.New member elected.Democratic hold.

|-
| William L. Nelson
|  | Democratic
| 1924
|  | Incumbent lost renomination.New member elected.Democratic hold.

|-
| Clarence Cannon
|  | Democratic
| 1922
| Incumbent re-elected.

|-
| John J. Cochran
|  | Democratic
| 1926
| Incumbent re-elected.

|-
| Clyde Williams
|  | Democratic
| 1930
| Incumbent re-elected.

|-
| James F. Fulbright
|  | Democratic
| 1930
|  | Incumbent lost renomination.New member elected.Democratic hold.

|-
| William Edward Barton
|  | Democratic
| 1930
|  | Incumbent lost renomination.New member elected.Democratic hold.

|-
| Henry F. Niedringhaus
|  | Republican
| 1926
|  | Incumbent lost reelection.Republican loss.

|-
| Leonidas C. Dyer
|  | Republican
| 1914
|  | Incumbent lost reelection.Republican loss.

|-
| Joe J. Manlove
|  | Republican
| 1922
|  | Incumbent retired.Republican loss.

|}

Montana 

|-
! 
| John M. Evans
|  | Democratic
| 1922
|  | Lost renomination.New member elected.Democratic hold.
| nowrap | 

|-
! 
| Scott Leavitt
|  | Republican
| 1922
|  | Incumbent lost re-election.New member elected.Democratic gain.
| nowrap | 

|}

Nebraska 

|-
! 
| John H. Morehead
|  | Democratic
| 1922
| Incumbent re-elected.
| nowrap | 

|-
! 
| Howard M. Baldrige
|  | Republican
| 1930
|  | Incumbent lost re-election.New member elected.Democratic gain.
| nowrap | 

|-
! 
| Edgar Howard
|  | Democratic
| 1922
| Incumbent re-elected.
| nowrap | 

|-
! rowspan=2 | 
| John N. Norton
|  | Democratic
| 1930
|  | Incumbent lost renomination.Democratic loss.
| rowspan=2 nowrap | 

|-
| Ashton C. Shallenberger
|  | Democratic
| 1930
| Incumbent re-elected.

|-
! 
| Robert G. Simmons
|  | Republican
| 1922
|  | Incumbent lost re-election.New member elected.Democratic gain.
| nowrap | 

|}

Nevada 

|-
! 
| Samuel S. Arentz
|  | Republican
| 1924
|  | Incumbent lost re-election.New member elected.Democratic gain.
| nowrap | 

|}

New Hampshire 

|-
! 
| William Nathaniel Rogers
|  | Democratic
| 1932
| Incumbent re-elected.
| nowrap | 

|-
! 
| Edward Hills Wason
|  | Republican
| 1914
|  | Incumbent retired.New member elected.Republican hold.
| nowrap | 

|}

New Jersey 

|-
! 
| Charles A. Wolverton
|  | Republican
| 1926
| Incumbent re-elected.
| nowrap | 

|-
! 
| Isaac Bacharach
|  | Republican
| 1914
| Incumbent re-elected.
| nowrap | 

|-
! 
| William H. Sutphin
|  | Democratic
| 1930
| Incumbent re-elected.
| nowrap | 

|-
! 
| colspan=3 | None (District created)
|  | New district.New member elected.Republican gain.
| nowrap | 

|-
! 
| Charles A. Eaton
|  | Republican
| 1924
| Incumbent re-elected.
| nowrap | 

|-
! 
| Percy Hamilton Stewart
|  | Democratic
| 1931
|  | Retired to run for U.S. senator.New member elected.Republican gain.
| nowrap | 

|-
! 
| Randolph Perkins
|  | Republican
| 1920
| Incumbent re-elected.
| nowrap | 

|-
! 
| George N. Seger
|  | Republican
| 1922
| Incumbent re-elected.
| nowrap | 

|-
! 
| colspan=3 | None (District created)
|  | New seat.New member elected.Democratic gain.
| nowrap | 

|-
! 
| Fred A. Hartley Jr.
|  | Republican
| 1928
| Incumbent re-elected.
| nowrap | 

|-
! 
| Peter Angelo Cavicchia
|  | Republican
| 1930
| Incumbent re-elected.
| nowrap | 

|-
! 
| Frederick R. Lehlbach
|  | Republican
| 1914
| Incumbent re-elected.
| nowrap | 

|-
! 
| Mary Teresa Norton
|  | Democratic
| 1924
| Incumbent re-elected.
| nowrap | 

|-
! 
| Oscar L. Auf der Heide
|  | Democratic
| 1924
| Incumbent re-elected.
| nowrap | 

|}

New Mexico 

|-
! 
| Dennis Chavez
|  | Democratic
| 1930
| Incumbent re-elected.
| nowrap | 

|}

New York 

New York, reapportioned from 43 to 45 seats, left its districts unchanged and elected the two new members at large.

|-
! 
| Robert L. Bacon
|  | Republican
| 1922
| Incumbent re-elected.
| nowrap | 

|-
! 
| William F. Brunner
|  | Democratic
| 1928
| Incumbent re-elected.
| nowrap | 

|-
! 
| George W. Lindsay
|  | Democratic
| 1922
| Incumbent re-elected.
| nowrap | 

|-
! 
| Thomas H. Cullen
|  | Democratic
| 1918
| Incumbent re-elected.
| nowrap | 

|-
! 
| Loring M. Black Jr.
|  | Democratic
| 1922
| Incumbent re-elected.
| nowrap | 

|-
! 
| Andrew Lawrence Somers
|  | Democratic
| 1924
| Incumbent re-elected.
| nowrap | 

|-
! 
| John J. Delaney
|  | Democratic
| 1931
| Incumbent re-elected.
| nowrap | 

|-
! 
| Patrick J. Carley
|  | Democratic
| 1926
| Incumbent re-elected.
| nowrap | 

|-
! 
| Stephen A. Rudd
|  | Democratic
| 1931
| Incumbent re-elected.
| nowrap | 

|-
! 
| Emanuel Celler
|  | Democratic
| 1922
| Incumbent re-elected.
| nowrap | 

|-
! 
| Anning S. Prall
|  | Democratic
| 1923
| Incumbent re-elected.
| nowrap | 

|-
! 
| Samuel Dickstein
|  | Democratic
| 1922
| Incumbent re-elected.
| nowrap | 

|-
! 
| Christopher D. Sullivan
|  | Democratic
| 1916
| Incumbent re-elected.
| nowrap | 

|-
! 
| William Irving Sirovich
|  | Democratic
| 1926
| Incumbent re-elected.
| nowrap | 

|-
! 
| John J. Boylan
|  | Democratic
| 1922
| Incumbent re-elected.
| nowrap | 

|-
! 
| John J. O'Connor
|  | Democratic
| 1923
| Incumbent re-elected.
| nowrap | 

|-
! 
| Ruth Baker Pratt
|  | Republican
| 1928
|  | Incumbent lost re-election.New member elected.Democratic gain.
| nowrap | 

|-
! 
| Martin J. Kennedy
|  | Democratic
| 1930
| Incumbent re-elected.
| nowrap | 

|-
! 
| Sol Bloom
|  | Democratic
| 1923
| Incumbent re-elected.
| nowrap | 

|-
! 
| Fiorello H. LaGuardia
|  | Republican
| 1922
|  | Incumbent lost re-election.New member elected.Democratic gain.
| nowrap | 

|-
! 
| Joseph A. Gavagan
|  | Democratic
| 1929
| Incumbent re-elected.
| nowrap | 

|-
! 
| Anthony J. Griffin
|  | Democratic
| 1918
| Incumbent re-elected.
| nowrap | 

|-
! 
| Frank Oliver
|  | Democratic
| 1922
| Incumbent re-elected.
| nowrap | 

|-
! 
| James M. Fitzpatrick
|  | Democratic
| 1926
| Incumbent re-elected.
| nowrap | 

|-
! 
| Charles D. Millard
|  | Republican
| 1930
| Incumbent re-elected.
| nowrap | 

|-
! 
| Hamilton Fish Jr.
|  | Republican
| 1920
| Incumbent re-elected.
| nowrap | 

|-
! 
| Harcourt J. Pratt
|  | Republican
| 1924
|  | Incumbent retired.New member elected.Republican hold.
| nowrap | 

|-
! 
| Parker Corning
|  | Democratic
| 1922
| Incumbent re-elected.
| nowrap | 

|-
! 
| James S. Parker
|  | Republican
| 1912
| Incumbent re-elected.
| nowrap | 

|-
! 
| Frank Crowther
|  | Republican
| 1918
| Incumbent re-elected.
| nowrap | 

|-
! 
| Bertrand Snell
|  | Republican
| 1915
| Incumbent re-elected.
| nowrap | 

|-
! 
| Francis D. Culkin
|  | Republican
| 1928
| Incumbent re-elected.
| nowrap | 

|-
! 
| Frederick M. Davenport
|  | Republican
| 1924
|  | Incumbent lost re-election.New member elected.Democratic gain.
| nowrap | 

|-
! 
| John D. Clarke
|  | Republican
| 1926
| Incumbent re-elected.
| nowrap | 

|-
! 
| Clarence E. Hancock
|  | Republican
| 1927
| Incumbent re-elected.
| nowrap | 

|-
! 
| John Taber
|  | Republican
| 1922
| Incumbent re-elected.
| nowrap | 

|-
! 
| Gale H. Stalker
|  | Republican
| 1922
| Incumbent re-elected.
| nowrap | 

|-
! 
| James L. Whitley
|  | Republican
| 1928
| Incumbent re-elected.
| nowrap | 

|-
! 
| Archie D. Sanders
|  | Republican
| 1916
|  | Incumbent retired.New member elected.Republican hold.
| nowrap | 

|-
! 
| Walter Gresham Andrews
|  | Republican
| 1930
| Incumbent re-elected.
| nowrap | 

|-
! 
| Edmund F. Cooke
|  | Republican
| 1928
|  | Incumbent lost re-election.New member elected.Democratic gain.
| nowrap | 

|-
! 
| James M. Mead
|  | Democratic
| 1918
| Incumbent re-elected.
| nowrap | 

|-
! 
| Daniel A. Reed
|  | Republican
| 1918
| Incumbent re-elected.
| nowrap | 

|-
! rowspan=2 | 
| colspan=3 | None (district created)
|  | New seat.New member elected.Democratic gain.
| rowspan=2 nowrap | 

|-
| colspan=3 | None (district created)
|  | New seat.New member elected.Democratic gain.

|}

North Carolina 

|-
! 
| Lindsay C. Warren
|  | Democratic
| 1924
| Incumbent re-elected.
| nowrap | 

|-
! 
| John H. Kerr
|  | Democratic
| 1923
| Incumbent re-elected.
| nowrap | 

|-
! 
| Charles L. Abernethy
|  | Democratic
| 1922
| Incumbent re-elected.
| nowrap | 

|-
! 
| Edward W. Pou
|  | Democratic
| 1900
| Incumbent re-elected.
| nowrap | 

|-
! 
| Franklin Wills Hancock Jr.
|  | Democratic
| 1930
| Incumbent re-elected.
| nowrap | 

|-
! 
| colspan=3 | None (District created)
|  | New seat.New member elected.Democratic gain.
| nowrap | 

|-
! 
| J. Bayard Clark
|  | Democratic
| 1928
| Incumbent re-elected.
| nowrap | 

|-
! 
| Walter Lambeth
|  | Democratic
| 1930
| Incumbent re-elected.
| nowrap | 

|-
! 
| Robert L. Doughton
|  | Democratic
| 1910
| Incumbent re-elected.
| nowrap | 

|-
! 
| Alfred L. Bulwinkle
|  | Democratic
| 1930
| Incumbent re-elected.
| nowrap | 

|-
! 
| Zebulon Weaver
|  | Democratic
| 1930
| Incumbent re-elected.
| nowrap | 

|}

North Dakota 

North Dakota was reapportioned from 3 seats to 2, and elected them at large.

|-
! rowspan=3 | 
| James H. Sinclair
|  | Republican
| 1918
| Incumbent re-elected.
| rowspan=3 nowrap | 

|-
| Olger B. Burtness
|  | Republican
| 1920
|  | Incumbent lost renomination.New member elected.Republican hold.

|-
| Thomas Hall
|  | Republican
| 1922
|  | Incumbent lost renomination.Republican loss.

|}

Ohio 

|-
! 
| John B. Hollister
|  | Republican
| 1931
| Incumbent re-elected.
| nowrap | 

|-
! 
| William E. Hess
|  | Republican
| 1928
| Incumbent re-elected.
| nowrap | 

|-
! 
| Byron B. Harlan
|  | Democratic
| 1930
| Incumbent re-elected.
| nowrap | 

|-
! 
| John L. Cable
|  | Republican
| 1928
|  | Incumbent lost re-election.New member elected.Democratic gain.
| nowrap | 

|-
! 
| Frank C. Kniffin
|  | Democratic
| 1930
| Incumbent re-elected.
| nowrap | 

|-
! 
| James G. Polk
|  | Democratic
| 1930
| Incumbent re-elected.
| nowrap | 

|-
! 
| Charles Brand
|  | Republican
| 1922
|  | Incumbent retired.New member elected.Republican hold.
| nowrap | 

|-
! 
| Grant E. Mouser
|  | Republican
| 1928
|  | Incumbent lost re-election.New member elected.Democratic gain.
| nowrap | 

|-
! 
| Wilbur M. White
|  | Republican
| 1930
|  | Incumbent lost re-election.New member elected.Democratic gain.
| nowrap | 

|-
! 
| Thomas A. Jenkins
|  | Republican
| 1924
| Incumbent re-elected.
| nowrap | 

|-
! 
| Mell G. Underwood
|  | Democratic
| 1922
| Incumbent re-elected.
| nowrap | 

|-
! 
| Arthur P. Lamneck
|  | Democratic
| 1930
| Incumbent re-elected.
| nowrap | 

|-
! 
| William L. Fiesinger
|  | Democratic
| 1930
| Incumbent re-elected.
| nowrap | 

|-
! 
| Francis Seiberling
|  | Republican
| 1928
|  | Incumbent lost re-election.New member elected.Democratic gain.
| nowrap | 

|-
! 
| C. Ellis Moore
|  | Republican
| 1918
|  | Incumbent lost re-election.New member elected.Democratic gain.
| nowrap | 

|-
! 
| Charles B. McClintock
|  | Republican
| 1928
|  | Incumbent lost re-election.New member elected.Democratic gain.
| nowrap | 

|-
! 
| Charles West
|  | Democratic
| 1930
| Incumbent re-elected.
| nowrap | 

|-
! 
| B. Frank Murphy
|  | Republican
| 1918
|  | Incumbent lost re-election.New member elected.Democratic gain.
| nowrap | 

|-
! 
| John G. Cooper
|  | Republican
| 1914
| Incumbent re-elected.
| nowrap | 

|-
! 
| Martin L. Sweeney
|  | Democratic
| 1931
| Incumbent re-elected.
| nowrap | 

|-
! 
| Robert Crosser
|  | Democratic
| 1922
| Incumbent re-elected.
| nowrap | 

|-
! 
| Chester C. Bolton
|  | Republican
| 1928
| Incumbent re-elected.
| nowrap | 

|-
! 
| colspan=3 | None (District created)
|  | New seat.New member elected.Democratic gain.
| rowspan=2 nowrap | 

|-
! 
| colspan=3 | None (District created)
|  | New seat.New member elected.Democratic gain.

|}

Oklahoma 

|-
! 
| Wesley E. Disney
|  | Democratic
| 1930
| Incumbent re-elected.
| nowrap | 

|-
! 
| William W. Hastings
|  | Democratic
| 1922
| Incumbent re-elected.
| nowrap | 

|-
! 
| Wilburn Cartwright
|  | Democratic
| 1926
| Incumbent re-elected.
| nowrap | 

|-
! 
| Tom D. McKeown
|  | Democratic
| 1922
| Incumbent re-elected.
| nowrap | 

|-
! 
| Fletcher B. Swank
|  | Democratic
| 1930
| Incumbent re-elected.
| nowrap | 

|-
! 
| Jed Johnson
|  | Democratic
| 1926
| Incumbent re-elected.
| nowrap | 

|-
! 
| James V. McClintic
|  | Democratic
| 1914
| Incumbent re-elected.
| nowrap | 

|-
! 
| Milton C. Garber
|  | Republican
| 1922
|  | Incumbent lost re-election.New member elected.Democratic gain.
| nowrap | 

|-
! 
| colspan=3 | None (District created)
|  | New seat.New member elected.Democratic gain.
| nowrap | 

|}

Oregon 

|-
! 
| Willis C. Hawley
|  | Republican
| 1906
|  | Incumbent lost renomination.New member elected.Republican hold.
| nowrap | 

|-
! 
| Robert R. Butler
|  | Republican
| 1928
|  | Incumbent lost re-election.New member elected.Democratic gain.
| nowrap | 

|-
! 
| Charles H. Martin
|  | Democratic
| 1930
| Incumbent re-elected.
| nowrap | 

|}

Pennsylvania 

|-
! 
| Harry C. Ransley
|  | Republican
| 1920
| Incumbent re-elected.
| nowrap | 

|-
! 
| James M. Beck
|  | Republican
| 1927
| Incumbent re-elected.
| nowrap | 

|-
! 
| Robert Lee Davis
|  | Republican
| 1932
|  | Incumbent retired.New member elected.Republican hold.
| nowrap | 

|-
! 
| Benjamin M. Golder
|  | Republican
| 1924
|  | Incumbent lost renomination.New member elected.Republican hold.
| nowrap | 

|-
! 
| James J. Connolly
|  | Republican
| 1920
| Incumbent re-elected.
| nowrap | 

|-
! 
| Edward L. Stokes
|  | Republican
| 1931
| Incumbent re-elected.
| nowrap | 

|-
! 
| George P. Darrow
|  | Republican
| 1914
| Incumbent re-elected.
| nowrap | 

|-
! 
| James Wolfenden
|  | Republican
| 1928
| Incumbent re-elected.
| nowrap | 

|-
! rowspan=2 | 
| Henry Winfield Watson
|  | Republican
| 1914
| Incumbent re-elected.
| rowspan=2 nowrap | 

|-
| Norton L. Lichtenwalner
|  | Democratic
| 1930
|  | Incumbent lost re-election.Democratic loss.
|-
! 
| J. Roland Kinzer
|  | Republican
| 1930
| Incumbent re-elected.
| nowrap | 

|-
! 
| Patrick J. Boland
|  | Democratic
| 1930
| Incumbent re-elected.
| nowrap | 

|-
! 
| Charles Murray Turpin
|  | Republican
| 1929
| Incumbent re-elected.
| nowrap | 

|-
! rowspan=2 | 
| George F. Brumm
|  | Republican
| 1928
| Incumbent re-elected.
| rowspan=2 nowrap | 

|-
| Frederick W. Magrady
|  | Republican
| 1924
|  | Incumbent lost renomination, ran and lost on Prohibition Party ticket.Republican loss.
|-
! 
| colspan=3 | New district.
|  | New seat.New member elected.Democratic hold.
| nowrap | 

|-
! 
| Louis T. McFadden
|  | Republican
| 1914
| Incumbent re-elected.
| nowrap | 

|-
! 
| Robert F. Rich
|  | Republican
| 1930
| Incumbent re-elected.
| nowrap | 

|-
! 
| colspan=3 | New district.
|  | New seat.New member elected.Republican gain.
| nowrap | 

|-
! 
| Edward M. Beers
|  | Republican
| 1922
|  | Incumbent died.New member elected.Republican hold.Winner was not elected to finish the current term.
| nowrap | 

|-
! 
| Isaac Hoffer Doutrich
|  | Republican
| 1926
| Incumbent re-elected.
| nowrap | 

|-
! 
| Thomas Cunningham Cochran
|  | Republican
| 1926
| Incumbent re-elected.
| nowrap | 

|-
! 
| William R. Coyle
|  | Republican
| 1928
|  | Incumbent lost re-election.New member elected.Democratic gain.
| nowrap | 

|-
! 
| Harry L. Haines
|  | Democratic
| 1930
| Incumbent re-elected.
| nowrap | 

|-
! rowspan=2 | 
| James Mitchell Chase
|  | Republican
| 1926
|  | Incumbent lost renomination.Republican loss.
| rowspan=2 nowrap | 

|-
| J. Banks Kurtz
|  | Republican
| 1922
| Incumbent re-elected.

|-
! 
| Samuel Austin Kendall
|  | Republican
| 1918
|  | Incumbent lost re-election.New member elected.Democratic gain.
| nowrap | 

|-
! 
| Henry Wilson Temple
|  | Republican
| 1912
|  | Incumbent lost re-election.New member elected.Democratic gain.
| nowrap | 

|-
! 
| J. Howard Swick
|  | Republican
| 1926
| Incumbent re-elected.
| nowrap | 

|-
! rowspan=2 | 
| Nathan Leroy Strong
|  | Republican
| 1916
| Incumbent re-elected.
| rowspan=2 nowrap | 

|-
| Howard W. Stull
|  | Republican
| 1932
|  | Incumbent lost renomination.Republican loss.

|-
! 
| Adam M. Wyant
|  | Republican
| 1920
|  | Incumbent lost re-election.New member elected.Democratic gain.
| nowrap | 

|-
! 
| Milton W. Shreve
|  | Republican
| 1918
|  | Incumbent lost re-election.New member elected.Democratic gain.
| nowrap | 

|-
! 
| Edmund Frederick Erk
|  | Republican
| 1930
|  | Incumbent lost re-election.New member elected.Democratic gain.
| nowrap | 

|-
! 
| Melville Clyde Kelly
|  | Republican
| 1916
| Incumbent re-elected.
| nowrap | 

|-
! 
| Patrick J. Sullivan
|  | Republican
| 1928
|  | Incumbent lost renomination.New member elected.Republican hold.
| nowrap | 

|-
! 
| Harry A. Estep
|  | Republican
| 1926
|  | Incumbent lost re-election.New member elected.Democratic gain.
| nowrap | 

|-
! 
| Guy E. Campbell
|  | Republican
| 1916
|  | Incumbent lost re-election.New member elected.Democratic gain.
| nowrap | 

|}

Puerto Rico 
See Non-voting delegates, below.

Rhode Island 

|-
! rowspan=2 | 
| Clark Burdick
|  | Republican
| 1918
|  | Incumbent lost re-election.Republican loss.
| rowspan=2 nowrap | 

|-
| Francis Condon
|  | Democratic
| 1930
| Incumbent re-elected.

|-
! 
| Richard S. Aldrich
|  | Republican
| 1922
|  | Incumbent retired.New member elected.Democratic gain.
| nowrap | 

|}

South Carolina 

|-
! 
| Thomas S. McMillan
|  | Democratic
| 1924
| Incumbent re-elected.
| nowrap | 

|-
! 
| Hampton P. Fulmer
|  | Democratic
| 1920
| Incumbent re-elected.
| nowrap | 

|-
! 
| Frederick H. Dominick
|  | Democratic
| 1916
|  | Incumbent lost renomination.New member elected.Democratic hold.
| nowrap | 

|-
! 
| John J. McSwain
|  | Democratic
| 1920
| Incumbent re-elected.
| nowrap | 

|-
! 
| William Francis Stevenson
|  | Democratic
| 1917
|  | Incumbent lost renomination.New member elected.Democratic hold.
| nowrap | 

|-
! 
| Allard H. Gasque
|  | Democratic
| 1922
| Incumbent re-elected.
| nowrap | 

|}

South Dakota 

|-
! 
| Charles A. Christopherson
|  | Republican
| 1918
|  | Incumbent lost re-election.New member elected.Democratic gain.
| nowrap | 

|-
! rowspan=2 | 
| Royal C. Johnson
|  | Republican
| 1914
|  | Incumbent retired.Republican loss.
| rowspan=2 nowrap | 

|-
| William Williamson
|  | Republican
| 1920
|  | Incumbent lost re-election.New member elected.Democratic gain.

|}

Tennessee 

|-
! 
| Oscar B. Lovette
|  | Republican
| 1930
|  | Incumbent lost renomination and re-election as an Independent.New member elected.Republican hold.
| nowrap | 

|-
! 
| J. Will Taylor
|  | Republican
| 1918
| Incumbent re-elected.
| nowrap | 

|-
! 
| Sam D. McReynolds
|  | Democratic
| 1922
| Incumbent re-elected.
| nowrap | 

|-
! 
| John Ridley Mitchell
|  | Democratic
| 1930
| Incumbent re-elected.
| nowrap | 

|-
! rowspan=2 | 
| Ewin L. Davis
|  | Democratic
| 1918
|  | Incumbent lost renomination.Democratic loss.
| rowspan=2 nowrap | 

|-
| Joseph W. Byrns Sr.
|  | Democratic
| 1908
| Incumbent re-elected.

|-
! 
| Willa McCord Blake Eslick
|  | Democratic
| 1932
|  | Incumbent retired.New member elected.Democratic hold.
| nowrap | 

|-
! 
| Gordon Browning
|  | Democratic
| 1922
| Incumbent re-elected.
| nowrap | 

|-
! 
| Jere Cooper
|  | Democratic
| 1928
| Incumbent re-elected.
| nowrap | 

|-
! 
| E. H. Crump 
|  | Democratic
| 1930
| Incumbent re-elected.
| nowrap | 

|}

Texas 

|-
! 
| Wright Patman
|  | Democratic
| 1928
| Incumbent re-elected.
| nowrap | 

|-
! 
| Martin Dies Jr.
|  | Democratic
| 1930
| Incumbent re-elected.
| nowrap | 

|-
! 
| Morgan G. Sanders
|  | Democratic
| 1920
| Incumbent re-elected.
| nowrap | 

|-
! 
| Sam Rayburn
|  | Democratic
| 1912
| Incumbent re-elected.
| nowrap | 

|-
! 
| Hatton W. Sumners
|  | Democratic
| 1914
| Incumbent re-elected.
| nowrap | 

|-
! 
| Luther A. Johnson
|  | Democratic
| 1922
| Incumbent re-elected.
| nowrap | 

|-
! 
| Clay Stone Briggs
|  | Democratic
| 1918
| Incumbent re-elected.
| nowrap | 

|-
! 
| Daniel E. Garrett
|  | Democratic
| 1920
| Incumbent re-elected.
| nowrap | 

|-
! 
| Joseph J. Mansfield
|  | Democratic
| 1916
| Incumbent re-elected.
| nowrap | 

|-
! 
| James P. Buchanan
|  | Democratic
| 1912
| Incumbent re-elected.
| nowrap | 

|-
! 
| Oliver H. Cross
|  | Democratic
| 1928
| Incumbent re-elected.
| nowrap | 

|-
! 
| Fritz G. Lanham
|  | Democratic
| 1919
| Incumbent re-elected.
| nowrap | 

|-
! 
| Guinn Williams
|  | Democratic
| 1922
|  | Incumbent retired.New member elected.Democratic hold.
| nowrap | 

|-
! 
| Richard M. Kleberg
|  | Democratic
| 1931
| Incumbent re-elected.
| nowrap | 

|-
! 
| John Nance Garner
|  | Democratic
| 1902
| Incumbent re-elected.
| nowrap | 

|-
! 
| R. Ewing Thomason
|  | Democratic
| 1930
| Incumbent re-elected.
| nowrap | 

|-
! 
| Thomas L. Blanton
|  | Democratic
| 1930
| Incumbent re-elected.
| nowrap | 

|-
! 
| John Marvin Jones
|  | Democratic
| 1916
| Incumbent re-elected.
| nowrap | 

|-
! rowspan=3 | 
| colspan=3 | None (District created)
|  | New seat.New member elected.Democratic gain.
| rowspan=3 nowrap | 

|-
| colspan=3 | None (District created)
|  | New seat.New member elected.Democratic gain.

|-
| colspan=3 | None (District created)
|  | New seat.New member elected.Democratic gain.

|}

Utah 

|-
! 
| Don B. Colton
|  | Republican
| 1920
|  | Incumbent lost re-election.New member elected.Democratic gain.
| nowrap | 

|-
! 
| Frederick C. Loofbourow
|  | Republican
| 1930
|  | Incumbent lost re-election.New member elected.Democratic gain.
| nowrap | 

|}

Vermont 

|-
! rowspan=2 | 
| John E. Weeks
|  | Republican
| 1930
|  | Incumbent retired.New member elected.Republican hold.
| rowspan=2 nowrap | 

|-
| Ernest Willard Gibson
|  | Republican
| 1923
| Incumbent re-elected.

|}

Virginia 

|-
! rowspan=10 | 
| S. Otis Bland
|  | Democratic
| 1918
| Incumbent re-elected.
| rowspan=10 nowrap | 

|-
| Menalcus Lankford
|  | Republican
| 1928
|  | Incumbent lost re-election.Republican loss.

|-
| Andrew Jackson Montague
|  | Democratic
| 1912
| Incumbent re-elected.

|-
| Patrick H. Drewry
|  | Democratic
| 1920
| Incumbent re-elected.

|-
| Thomas G. Burch
|  | Democratic
| 1930
| Incumbent re-elected.

|-
| Clifton A. Woodrum
|  | Democratic
| 1922
| Incumbent re-elected.

|-
| John W. Fishburne
|  | Democratic
| 1930
|  | Incumbent retired.New member elected.Democratic hold.

|-
| Howard W. Smith
|  | Democratic
| 1930
| Incumbent re-elected.

|-
| John W. Flannagan Jr.
|  | Democratic
| 1930
| Incumbent re-elected.

|-
| Joel West Flood
|  | Democratic
| 1918
|  | Incumbent retired.New member elected.Democratic hold.

|}

Washington 

|-
! 
| Ralph A. Horr
|  | Republican
| 1930
|  | Incumbent lost renomination.New member elected.Democratic gain.
| nowrap | 

|-
! 
| Lindley H. Hadley
|  | Republican
| 1914
|  | Incumbent lost re-election.New member elected.Democratic gain.
| nowrap | 

|-
! 
| Albert Johnson
|  | Republican
| 1912
|  | Incumbent lost re-election.New member elected.Democratic gain.
| nowrap | 

|-
! 
| John W. Summers
|  | Republican
| 1918
|  | Incumbent lost re-election.New member elected.Democratic gain.
| nowrap | 

|-
! 
| Samuel B. Hill
|  | Democratic
| 1923
| Incumbent re-elected.
| nowrap | 

|-
! 
| colspan=3 | None (District created)
|  | New seat.New member elected.Democratic gain.
| nowrap | 

|}

West Virginia 

|-
! 
| Carl G. Bachmann
|  | Republican
| 1924
|  | Incumbent lost re-election.New member elected.Democratic gain.
| nowrap | 

|-
! 
| Frank L. Bowman
|  | Republican
| 1924
|  | Incumbent lost re-election.New member elected.Democratic gain.
| nowrap | 

|-
! 
| Lynn Hornor
|  | Democratic
| 1930
| Incumbent re-elected.
| nowrap | 

|-
! 
| Robert Lynn Hogg
|  | Republican
| 1930
|  | Incumbent lost re-election.New member elected.Democratic gain.
| nowrap | 

|-
! 
| Hugh Ike Shott
|  | Republican
| 1928
|  | Incumbent lost re-election.New member elected.Democratic gain.
| nowrap | 

|-
! 
| Joe L. Smith
|  | Democratic
| 1928
| Incumbent re-elected.
| nowrap | 

|}

Wisconsin 

|-
! 
| Thomas Ryum Amlie
|  | Republican
| 1931 
|  | Incumbent lost renomination.New member elected.Republican hold.
| nowrap | 

|-
! rowspan=2 | 
| Charles A. Kading
|  | Republican
| 1926
|  | Incumbent lost renomination.New member elected.Democratic gain.
| rowspan=2 nowrap | 

|-
| John M. Nelson
|  | Republican
| 1920
|  | Incumbent lost renomination.Republican loss.

|-
! 
| Gardner R. Withrow
|  | Republican
| 1920
| Incumbent re-elected.
| nowrap | 

|-
! 
| John C. Schafer
|  | Republican
| 1922
|  | Incumbent lost re-election.New member elected.Democratic gain.
| nowrap | 

|-
! 
| William H. Stafford
|  | Republican
| 1928
|  | Incumbent lost renomination.New member elected.Democratic gain.
| nowrap | 

|-
! 
| Michael Reilly
|  | Democratic
| 1930
| Incumbent re-elected.
| nowrap | 

|-
! 
| Gerald J. Boileau
|  | Republican
| 1930
| Incumbent re-elected.
| nowrap | 

|-
! 
| George J. Schneider
|  | Republican
| 1922
|  | Incumbent lost re-election.New member elected.Democratic gain.
| nowrap | 

|-
! 
| James A. Frear
|  | Republican
| 1912
| Incumbent re-elected.
| nowrap | 

|-
! 
| Hubert H. Peavey
|  | Republican
| 1922
| Incumbent re-elected.
| nowrap | 

|}

Wyoming 

|-
! 
| Vincent Carter
|  | Republican
| 1928
| Incumbent re-elected.
| nowrap | 

|}

Non-voting delegates 

|-
! 
| James Wickersham
|  | Republican
| 19081916 1918 1920 1930
|  | Incumbent lost re-election.New delegate elected.Democratic gain.
| nowrap | 

|-
! 

|-
! 
| José Lorenzo Pesquera
|  | Union Party
| 1932 
|  | Incumbent retired.New delegate elected.Socialist gain.
| nowrap | 

|}

See also
 1932 United States elections
 1932 United States Senate elections
 1932 United States presidential election
 72nd United States Congress
 73rd United States Congress

Notes

References